Scott Wallace may refer to:

Scott Wallace (photojournalist) (born 1954), American journalist
Scott Wallace (politician), Democratic candidate for U.S. House of Representatives in 2018 
Scott Wallace (River City), a fictional character in the TV series River City
George Scott Wallace (1929–2011), Canadian physician and politician
William S. Wallace (born 1946), American army general
Wallace Scott (1924–2003), American aviator and author
Tammy Scott-Wallace, Canadian politician
John Wallace Scott (1832–1903), American soldier

See also